Andreas Rimkus (born 24 December 1962) is a German electrician and politician of the Social Democratic Party (SPD) who has been serving as a member of the Bundestag from the state of North Rhine-Westphalia since 2013.

Political career 
Rimkus became a member of the Bundestag in the 2013 German federal election. In parliament, he was a member of the Committee on Transport and Digital Infrastructure from 2013 until 2017 before moving to the Committee on Economic Affairs and Energy in 2018. In this capacity, he serves as his parliamentary group's rapporteur on Germany's National Hydrogen Strategy.

In addition to his committee assignments, Rimkus is part of the German-Japanese Parliamentary Friendship Group and the German Parliamentary Friendship Group for relations with Belgium and Luxembourg.

Within the SPD parliamentary group, Rimkus belongs to the Parliamentary Left, a left-wing movement.

Other activities 
 Business Forum of the Social Democratic Party of Germany, Member of the Political Advisory Board (since 2020)
 German United Services Trade Union (ver.di), Member

References

External links 

 Bundestag biography 

1962 births
Living people
Members of the Bundestag for North Rhine-Westphalia
Members of the Bundestag 2021–2025
Members of the Bundestag 2017–2021
Members of the Bundestag 2013–2017
Members of the Bundestag for the Social Democratic Party of Germany